Angiolino Gasparini (born March 22, 1951) is a retired Italian professional football player.

Honours
 Coppa Italia winner: 1977/78.

External links
 Career summary by playerhistory.com

1951 births
Living people
Italian footballers
Serie A players
Serie B players
Brescia Calcio players
Hellas Verona F.C. players
Inter Milan players
Ascoli Calcio 1898 F.C. players
A.C. Monza players
Association football defenders